In architecture, a starling (or sterling) is a defensive bulwark, usually built with pilings or bricks, surrounding the supports (or piers) of a bridge or similar construction.  Starlings may be shaped to ease the flow of the water around the bridge, reducing the damage caused by erosion or collisions with flood-borne debris, and may also form an important part of the structure of the bridge, spreading the weight of the piers. 

The term cutwater is used for such a structure shaped with water flow in mind, as a pier or starling with a diamond point.  A starkwater is a bulwark against ice floes.

Depending on their shape and location, some starlings may accumulate river debris, mud and other objects, potentially creating navigational hazards or hindering downstream water flow.

Shape

Starlings may form part of a buttress for the vertical load of the bridge piers, and for that purpose would typically be symmetrical. Examples such as at the Old Wye Bridge, Chepstow are on lower stretches of rivers which are tidal and that require a starling in both directions. Other starlings may be asymmetrical, so that the upstream aspect of a pier is larger as it a face sloping outwards, whilst downstream is vertical.

The starling has a sharpened or curved extreme sometimes called the nose. The cutwater may be of concrete or masonry, but is often capped with a steel angle to resist abrasion and focus force at a single point to fracture floating pieces of ice striking the pier. In cold climates the starling is typically sloped at an angle of about 45°  so current pushing against part-submerged ice flow tends to lift the solid ice, translating horizontal force of the current to a vertical force shearing the ice allowing the icy flows to pass on either side. A sloped, ice-cutting starling is known as a starkwater.

See also 
 Breakwater
 Icebreaker

References 

Bridge components
Hydraulic engineering